Polizoi Arbëri (born 9 September 1988) is an Albanian former footballer who played as a defender or midfielder.

Club career

Vllaznia Shkodër
On 15 August 2015, Arbëri signed a one-year deal with fellow Albanian Superliga side Vllaznia Shkodër as a free transfer. He was presented to the media two days later, where he was allocated squad number 13. During his presentation, Arbëri said: "I'm very happy with my choice. I'm glad that i'm going to be with Vllaznia for the upcoming season. I know this squad and naturally signed for this team for its name."

He made his Vllaznia Shkodër debut on 9 September 2015 in the league match against Skënderbeu Korçë, playing full-90 minutes in a losing effort at neutral ground of Ismail Xhemali Stadium. On 30 September, in his Albanian Cup debut against Pogradeci for the second leg of the first round, Arbëri successfully converted a penalty-kick for his first goal of the season, helping the team to win the match 4–0 and to progress in the next round with the aggregate 5–1.

Arbëri scored his first league goal of the season against Tirana on 25 October in a 1–1 draw; he scored the goal in the 86th minute with a precise curled free-kick to help his team to earn a point in the bid to escape relegation. He dedicated the goal to the fans.

On 16 March 2016, Arbëri suffered an injury in his left knee that would rule him out for the rest of 2015–16 season. At the end of the month, it was reported that he would undergo surgery in his left knee on 12 or 13 April and also extended his contract with the club for another one season. He was eventually operated on 15 April.

Kukësi
On 13 June 2016, Arbëri joined fellow Albanian Superliga side Kukësi by signing an initial one-year contract with an option of a further one. His debut occurred on 24 August in the Albanian Supercup match against Skënderbeu Korçë, playing full-90 minutes as Kukësi won 3–1 at Selman Stërmasi Stadium to win its maiden Albanian Supercup title. His league debut came later on 8 September in the opening matchday against his former side Vllaznia Shkodër. He played the entire match which ended in a goalless draw. One week later, Arbëri suffered another major knee injury just before the start of the second matchday against Teuta Durrës. He torn the ligament of his right leg, which kept him sidelined for the next five months. In April of the following year, Arbëri was released from the club after his constant knee issues.

Retirement
On 14 July 2017, with his knee not getting healed, Arbëri decided to retire from football at the age of 28, thus ending his 10-year career. In an interview, he said that not winning the title with Kukësi was his biggest regret in football, also adding that he felt like home at Vllaznia.

International career

Arbëri was first called up to the Albania U21 side in April 2008 by coach Artan Bushati. He was called up along with players also uncapped at U21 level such as Shpëtim Moçka and Vilfor Hysa. Bushati the players through their paces in Kamëz as they were playing for a place in his U21 side.

His first U21 goal came in a friendly against Macedonia at the Biljanini Izvori Sports Hall in Ohrid on 19 November 2008. Arbëri netted the third and final goal for Albania in a 3–0 victory. His goal came in the 80th minute of the game as a result of some excellent play by Enco Malindi who set up the goal for Arbëri.

Personal life
Arbëri is the younger brother of Gersi Arbëri, who is also a professional footballer who plays for Tomori Berat in the Albanian First Division. He have a son named Noel.

Career statistics

Honours
Flamurtari Vlorë

Albanian Cup: 2013–14
Albanian Supercup: Runner-up 2014

Kukësi
Albanian Supercup: 2016

References

External links

 
 

1988 births
Living people
Sportspeople from Berat
Albanian footballers
Albania under-21 international footballers
Albania youth international footballers
Association football midfielders
Association football defenders
FK Tomori Berat players
KS Lushnja players
KF Bylis Ballsh players
Flamurtari Vlorë players
KF Vllaznia Shkodër players
FK Kukësi players
Kategoria e Parë players
Kategoria Superiore players